Rehoboth is an unincorporated community in Harris County, in the U.S. state of Georgia.

History
The community was named after Rehoboth, a place mentioned in the Hebrew Bible. A variant name was "Mobley". Rehoboth was once an incorporated municipality; its municipal charter was repealed in 1995.

References

Former municipalities in Georgia (U.S. state)
Populated places disestablished in 1995
Unincorporated communities in Harris County, Georgia